El árbol de Gabriel (English title: Gabriel's Family Tree) is a Venezuelan telenovela written by Alberto Barrera Tyszka and produced by Venevisión.

Jorge Reyes and Daniela Bascopé star as the main protagonists, while Cristobal Lander, Roxana Diaz, and Myriam Abreu star as the antagonists.

On September 7, 2011, Venevisión started broadcasting El árbol de Gabriel weekdays at 9:00 pm, replacing La viuda joven. The last episode was broadcast on May 15, 2012, with Mi ex me tiene ganas replacing it the following day.

Plot
Gabriel León is a mega-popular television personality and host of the highest rated variety show in the country El maratón de la alegria. Plus, he is married to one of the most beautiful women in the country, Angie Sorelli. But all his fame and fortune cannot aid him when he is diagnosed with a serious illness requiring a transplant and he has to look for a direct relative who will be the right donor. Although he has no immediate family, Gabriel has a secret from the past. Years ago, he donated his sperm to a fertility clinic in order to make ends meet. Now with the help of his friends, he seeks out his biological children and in the process, he will meet five women: Magdalena, Nayarí, Valentina, Brenda, and Ana Belén.

While trying to find his biological children, Gabriel will find true love in Magdalena, a photographer. But their happiness will face various obstacles since they are both stuck in failed marriages. Magdalena's husband Agustín Camejo, who married her for her wealth and is having an affair with her best friend Sofía, will not allow her to leave him for Gabriel, while Angie will do anything to keep her husband by her side. Also, Sofía and Agustín have a secret of their own, he lied to Magdalena that she was inseminated with his sperm when it was actually from a donor, who later happens to be Gabriel.  The new branches in Gabriel's family tree will change his life, and he will have to change his priorities and perspectives in life, as well as fighting for his one true love.

Cast

Main 
 Jorge Reyes as Gabriel León Ruíz
 Daniela Bascopé as Magdalena Miranda de Camejo

Also main 
 Nohely Arteaga as Valentina Pacheco
 Aroldo Betancourt as Efraín Fernández
 Roxana Díaz as Sofía Alvarado
 Cristóbal Lander as Agustín Camejo
 Roque Valero as Epicúreo "Epi" Morales / Carmen Garcés
 Elaiza Gil as Nayarí Rosales
 Alfonso Medina as Antonio "Toño" Gualtero
 Laura Chimaras as Julieta Fernández Iturria
 Myriam Abreu as Angie Sorelli de León
 Lourdes Valera as Bárbara Miranda
 Beatriz Vázquez as Ana Belén Iturria de Fernández
 Eulalia Siso as Amelia Ruíz de León

Secondary cast 

 Paula Woyzechowsky as Gloria Falcón
 Rhandy Piñango as Ricardo Arismendi
 Erika Santiago as Marilyn González
 Mariely Ortega as Brenda Sánchez
 José Ramón Barreto as Deibis Rosales
 Sindy Lazo as Patricia Picón
 José Manuel Suárez as Maikel Blanco
 Vanessa Di Quattro as Dilenis Barreto
 Greisy Mena as Zuleika
 Gabriel López as Saúl Navas "Seis Nueve"
 Sebastián Quevedo as Rodrigo Camejo Miranda
 Diego Villarroel as William Guillermo Sánchez
 Edgard Serrano as Dr. Martínez
 Franci Otazo as Fanny
 Jenny Valdés as Irma
 Romelia Agüero as Lucrecia
 Alejandro Corona as Miguel Calixto Jamer
 Hernán Iturbe Decan as Joaquín
 Irene Delgado as Melanie
 Héctor Manrique as Merlín
 Virginia Lancaster as Virginia

Special participation 
 Carlos Cruz as Maximiliano Reyes
 Diosa Canales as Herself

References

External links
Official Site 
 

Venevisión telenovelas
Venezuelan telenovelas
2011 telenovelas
2011 Venezuelan television series debuts
2012 Venezuelan television series endings
Spanish-language telenovelas
Television shows set in Caracas